The 1989 HFC American Racing Series Championship consisted of 12 races. Mike Groff and Tommy Byrne each won 4 races and Groff edged out Byrne by 10 points for the championship.

Calendar

Race summaries

Phoenix race
Held April 8 at Phoenix International Raceway. Mike Groff won the pole.

Top Five Results
 Mike Groff
 Paul Tracy
 Dave Kudrave
 Johnny O'Connell
 Ted Prappas

Long Beach race
Held April 16 at Long Beach, California Street Course. Tommy Byrne won the pole.

Top Five Results
 Tommy Byrne
 P. J. Jones
 Mitch Thieman
 Daniel Campeau
 Roberto Quintanilla

Milwaukee race
Held June 4 at The Milwaukee Mile. Mike Groff won the pole.

Top Five Results
 Mike Groff
 Dave Kudrave
 Gary Rubio
 Tommy Byrne
 Steve Shelton

Detroit race
Held June 18 at the Detroit street circuit. Johnny O'Connell won the pole.

Top Five Results
 Ted Prappas
 Calvin Fish
 Gary Rubio
 Mike Groff
 Steve Shelton

Portland race
Held June 25 at Portland International Raceway. Tommy Byrne won the pole.

Top Five Results
 Tommy Byrne
 Paul Tracy
 Ted Prappas
 Gary Rubio
 Mike Groff

Meadowlands race
Held July 16 at the Meadowlands Sports Complex. Mike Groff won the pole.

Top Five Results
 Mike Groff
 Tommy Byrne
 Gary Rubio
 Paul Tracy
 Steve Shelton

Toronto race
Held July 23 at Exhibition Place. Tommy Byrne won the pole.

Top Five Results
 Gary Rubio
 P. J. Jones
 Dave Kudrave
 Ted Prappas
 Hunter Jones

Pocono race
Held August 19 at Pocono Raceway. Tommy Byrne won the pole.

Top Five Results
 Tommy Byrne
 Gary Rubio
 Ted Prappas
 Dave Kudrave
 Johnny O'Connell

Mid-Ohio race
Held September 3 at The Mid-Ohio Sports Car Course. Tommy Byrne won the pole.

Top Five Results
 P. J. Jones
 Mike Groff
 Paul Tracy
 Ted Prappas
 Gary Rubio

Elkhart Lake race
Held September 10 at Road America. Ted Prappas won the pole.

Top Five Results
 Tommy Byrne
 Johnny O'Connell
 Gary Rubio
 Mike Groff
 Dave Kudrave

Nazareth race
Held September 24 at Nazareth Speedway. Dave Kudrave won the pole.

Top Five Results
 Mike Groff
 Tommy Byrne
 Dave Kudrave
 Marty Roth
 Gary Rubio

Laguna Seca race
Held October 15 at Mazda Raceway Laguna Seca. Tommy Byrne won the pole.

Top Five Results
 Johnny O'Connell
 Mike Groff
 P. J. Jones
 Tommy Byrne
 Dave Kudrave

Final points standings

Driver

For every race the points were awarded: 20 points to the winner, 16 for runner-up, 14 for third place, 12 for fourth place, 10 for fifth place, 8 for sixth place, 6 seventh place, winding down to 1 points for 12th place. Additional points were awarded to the pole winner (1 point) and to the driver leading the most laps (1 point).

Complete Overview

R9=retired, but classified NS=did not start

References 

Indy Lights seasons
American Racing Series Season, 1989
American Racing Series